Martina Malević (born 7 December 1990) is a Croatian volleyball player. She last played as libero for Croatian club HAOK Mladost.

References

External links
Martina Malević at CEV.eu

1990 births
Living people
Croatian women's volleyball players
Sportspeople from Zagreb
Expatriate volleyball players in France
Expatriate volleyball players in Germany
Competitors at the 2013 Mediterranean Games
Mediterranean Games bronze medalists for Croatia
Mediterranean Games medalists in volleyball
21st-century Croatian women